Hydrolaetare schmidti (Schmidt's forest frog) is a species of frog in the family Leptodactylidae.
It has a scattered distribution in the Amazon Basin in Brazil, Colombia, French Guiana, and Peru.
Its natural habitats are subtropical or tropical moist lowland forest, subtropical or tropical swamps, rivers, and freshwater marshes. It is named after Karl Patterson Schmidt, American herpetologist.

References

Hydrolaetare
Amphibians of Brazil
Amphibians of Colombia
Amphibians of French Guiana
Amphibians of Peru
Amphibians described in 1959
Taxonomy articles created by Polbot